The Diocese of Equilio was a Roman Catholic ecclesiastical territory in the town of Equilio the province of Venice, Italy. It was suppressed in 1466 to the Patriarchate of Venice.

History
800: Erected as Diocese of Equilio
1466: Suppressed to the Patriarchate of Venice
1966: Restored as the Titular Episcopal See of Equilio

Ordinaries
Antonio Bono (Bon) (6 Feb 1443 - 1451 Died) 
Andreas Bono (15 Nov 1451 - 1466 Died)

See also
Catholic Church in Italy

References

Former Roman Catholic dioceses in Italy